David Alan Douglas (born August 19, 1979) is an American musician, most widely known for being in the Christian music industry as the drummer of the Christian rock band Relient K. Douglas joined the band after their former drummer, Stephen Cushman, departed in late 2000. Douglas had initially played the drums and provided background vocals for the band for seven years. In 2014, he returned to playing in the band in a touring capacity, and became a full member again in 2022.

His style often focuses on heavy snare hits on the beat and complex kick patterns.

He sang a few solos for the band, and had also started a side solo music project called Agnes. Back when he joined Relient K, Douglas was also filling in as a guitarist for Ace Troubleshooter, whose frontman was future Relient K bassist John Warne. In Summer 2006, Douglas announced another side project called Gypsy Parade, which he performs alongside his wife. He is currently writing more songs for both of his side projects.

Douglas has professed an interest in airplanes and said that when he was younger, he either wanted to be a pilot or a musician when he grew up. While he is obviously a musician, he said he still wants to get his pilot's license someday.

Dave Douglas announced October 18, 2007 that he would be resigning from Relient K on December 29, 2007. He had started pursuing new musical avenues, and he started devoting as much time as possible to Gypsy Parade. That band has been reformed and now called Attack Cat.

Agnes

Douglas had a solo side project, Agnes. His first three songs debuted on Mono vs Stereo's My Other Band, Vol. 1, which was released in June 2006. The CD was a compilation for members of Christian rock bands to get out side projects of theirs to the public. This project has its own unique sound compared to that of Relient K, although there are hints of Relient K's earlier sound in it.

Douglas started Agnes in late 2005, after tossing the idea around in his head for a few years. The side project was announced on MySpace by his Relient K bandmate Jonathan Schneck around May 2006. He has also done some vocal solos in the Relient K songs "Failure to Excommunicate", "Hoopes I Did It Again", "I Am Understood", "I So Hate Consequences", "More Than Useless", "Life After Death & Taxes (Failure II)", "Apathetic Way to Be", and "I Need You". He also provided vocals for their Christmas songs and for their cover of "The Pirates Who Don't Do Anything".

Douglas explained the name "Agnes" originated in a book that he enjoyed, David Copperfield by Charles Dickens.

Songs
All songs can be found on Mono vs Stereo's My Other Band, Vol. 1.
 "Gravity"
 "The Brakes"
 "Privileged Few"

Gypsy Parade

Gypsy Parade was another side project by Dave Douglas. Unlike Agnes, Douglas performed for Gypsy Parade with Rachel Hoskins. They recorded a few songs, "Shining", "In Every Moment", and "The Fight of Dugger Ripley" for the project, and released them on their MySpace page.

Agnes was started in late 2005, and has the sound of Relient K's earlier music. Gypsy Parade has an obvious rock sound to it, but is not as heavy in some parts of later songs.

A four-track EP was released on July 2, 2009.

Attack Cat

Attack Cat is the latest band started by Douglas and Hoskins. They have released two EPs, the second, Dandy Outlaws, was released on October 18, 2011.

Relient K

Douglas rejoined Relient K in October 2014 for the MMHMM 10th Anniversary Tour, providing both drums and backup vocals. This marked the first time he played with the band since his departure in 2007. He continued to serve as a touring and session member before being made an official member again in 2022.

References

1979 births
Living people
American performers of Christian music
Relient K members
American rock drummers
20th-century American drummers
American male drummers
21st-century American drummers